1905-06 was Ethnikos' second season of organised football, competing in the second Panhellenic Championship, in which the club came first.

Panhellenic Championship

All Matches

Squad

References

 Empros Newspaper, 19 February 1907 issue (Page 2, Greek)
 Empros Newspaper, 25 February 1907 issue (Page 2, Greek)

1906–07 in Greek football